Local elections were held on 19 November 2013 in Denmark's 98 municipal councils, contesting 2,444 seats (previous election: 2,468 seats) for the 2014–2017 term of office, and in five regional councils, contesting 205 seats for the 2014–2017 term. Advance voting began on 20 August 2013 in national registration offices in Denmark, hospitals, prisons, etc. Twelve women held the highest political office of mayor in the municipalities in the 2014–2017 term of office.

Results

Results of regional elections
The Ministry of Economy and Interior stated that voter turnout was 71.7%. The regions are not municipalities, and are not allowed to levy any taxes, but are financed only through block grants from the central government and the municipalities within each region.

Number of councillors and political parties in the regional councils

Old and new chairs of the regional councils

On 22 June 2015, Stephanie Lose became chairman of the Region of Southern Denmark. She is from Venstre. Carl Holst became a minister in the government of Denmark.

Results of municipal elections
The Ministry of Economy and Interior stated that voter turnout was 71.9%. 2,444 councillors were elected.

Number of councillors and political parties in the municipal councils

{| class="wikitable sortable mw-collapsible mw-collapsed" 
|+ class="nowrap" | Local Political Parties in the Municipal Councils
|-
!style="background-color:#E9E9E9"|Party
!style="background-color:#E9E9E9"|Municipality
!style="background-color":#E9E9E9"|Seats
|-
|Citizens' List
|align="left" |Kerteminde 
|align="right" |6
|-
|Gulborgsund List
|align="left" |Guldborgsund 
|align="right" |6
|-
|Common List
|align="left" |Ikast-Brande 
|align="right" |5
|-
|Citizens' List
|align="left" |Faxe 
|align="right" |4
|-
|Citizens' List Langeland
|align="left" |Langeland 
|align="right" |4
|-
|Democratic Balance
|align="left" |Morsø 
|align="right" |4
|-
|Local List
|align="left" |Rudersdal 
|align="right" |4
|-
|NewGribskov
|align="left" |Gribskov 
|align="right" |4
|-
|Cross-Political Community
|align="left" |Dragør 
|align="right" |3
|-
|Hvidovre List
|align="left" |Hvidovre 
|align="right" |3
|-
|Resident List
|align="left" |Randers 
|align="right" |3
|-
|Social Common List – Rebild
|align="left" |Rebild 
|align="right" |3
|-
|Catchment List
|align="left" |Rebild 
|align="right" |2
|-
|Citizens' List
|align="left" |Brønderslev 
|align="right" |2
|-
|Citizens' List Norddjurs
|align="left" |Norddjurs 
|align="right" |2
|-
|Common List
|align="left" |Hillerød 
|align="right" |2
|-
|Common List
|align="left" |Sønderborg 
|align="right" |2
|-
|Environment List
|align="left" |Fanø 
|align="right" |2
|-
|Land Owners
|align="left" |Solrød 
|align="right" |2
|-
|Local List
|align="left" |Hjørring 
|align="right" |2
|-
|Læsø List
|align="left" |Læsø 
|align="right" |2
|-
|New Allerød 
|align="left" |Allerød 
|align="right" |2
|-
|Odsherred List
|align="left" |Odsherred 
|align="right" |2
|-
|Ærø's Future
|align="left" |Ærø 
|align="right" |2
|-
|Ærø Plus
|align="left" |Ærø 
|align="right" |2
|-
|Amager List
|align="left" |Dragør 
|align="right" |1
|-
|Blovstrød List
|align="left" |Allerød 
|align="right" |1
|-
|Bornholm List
|align="left" |Bornholm 
|align="right" |1
|-
|Citizens' List
|align="left" |Billund 
|align="right" |1
|-
|Citizens' List
|align="left" |Syddjurs 
|align="right" |1
|-
|Citizens' List Frederikssund
|align="left" |Frederikssund 
|align="right" |1
|-
|Citizens' List in Hørsholm
|align="left" |Hørsholm 
|align="right" |1
|-
|Citizens' List Jammerbugten
|align="left" |Jammerbugt 
|align="right" |1
|-
|Citizens' Voice
|align="left" |Fredensborg 
|align="right" |1
|-
|Cooperation List
|align="left" |Læsø 
|align="right" |1
|-
|Cross-Socialist List in Svendborg
|align="left" |Svendborg 
|align="right" |1
|-
|Fanø Local List
|align="left" |Fanø 
|align="right" |1
|-
|Fjord List
|align="left" |Ringkøbing-Skjern 
|align="right" |1
|-
|Havdrup List
|align="left" |Solrød 
|align="right" |1
|-
|Local Democrats
|align="left" |Helsingør 
|align="right" |1
|-
|Local List Lolland
|align="left" |Lolland 
|align="right" |1
|-
|Læsø Citizens' List
|align="left" |Læsø 
|align="right" |1
|-
|New Centrum
|align="left" |Køge 
|align="right" |1
|-
|North Funen List
|align="left" |Nordfyn 
|align="right" |1
|-
|Common List Samsø
|align="left" |Samsø 
|align="right" |1
|-
|Southern Funen's List
|align="left" |Faaborg-Midtfyn 
|align="right" |1
|-
|Stevns List
|align="left" |Stevns 
|align="right" |1
|-
|Svendborg Local List
|align="left" |Svendborg 
|align="right" |1
|-
|Welfare List
|align="left" |Randers 
|align="right" |1
|-
|style="background-color:#E9E9E9" colspan="2"|Total'|align="right" style="background-color:#E9E9E9"|99
|}

Mayors in the municipalities
The mayors of the 98 municipalities head the council meetings and are the chairmen of the finance committee in each of their respective municipalities. Only in Copenhagen, this mayor – the head of the finance committee and council meetings – is called the lord mayor. Mette Touborg is the mayor of Lejre Municipality since 1 January 2010. She is the only one at present from the Socialist People's Party to hold the highest political post in a municipality. Rebild Municipality has a new mayor since 1 January 2014, Leon Sebbelin from the Danish Social Liberal Party. Tobias Birch Johansen, the mayor of Læsø Municipality, is a member of the agrarian liberal Venstre, but he is elected on the local list Læsø Listen.

Old and new mayors in the municipalities
The term of office for the mayors elected by the majority of councillors among its members in each municipal council is the same as for the councils elected, namely 1 January 2014 until 31 December 2017. The correct name for the municipality on the somewhat remote island of Bornholm is regional municipality because the municipality also handles tasks not carried out by the other Danish municipalities but by the regions. As just one example, as the only one of the 46 municipalities in eastern Denmark it is a 100% owner of its own public mass transit agency called BAT, formerly Bornholms Amts Trafikselskab. The public traffic agency of the other 45 municipalities in eastern Denmark is Movia, owned by the Capital Region of Denmark, Region Zealand and the 45 municipalities.

Notes

References

External links
"Local Elections 13" on the Danish English-speaking website Copenhagen Post''
 Election results by Municipality
 Three out of five of 2444 municipal council members reelected

2013
2013 elections in Denmark
November 2013 events in Europe